Mari Beatrice "Bea" Uusma, previously Uusma Schyffert (born 20 March 1966 in Lidingö, Sweden), is a Swedish author, illustrator and medical doctor.

Biography
Uusma was born and raised in Lidingö in Stockholm County. In 1999, she wrote and illustrated a children's book about the American astronaut Michael Collins titled The Man Who Went to the Far Side of the Moon: The Story of Apollo 11 Astronaut Michael Collins. In the mid-1990s she became interested in S. A. Andrée's Arctic Balloon Expedition of 1897 and tried to find out what happened to the expedition members. This research resulted in the book The Expedition, published in English by Head of Zeus in 2014, and for which she was awarded The August Prize in 2013.

After working as an illustrator for several years, Uusma started studying medicine and is now working as a medical doctor in Stockholm. She says her medical knowledge was useful in her research for The Expedition.

Uusma was awarded the August Prize, a Swedish literary award, for non-fiction for The Expedition in 2013.

She was married to Swedish comedian Henrik Schyffert between 1996 and 2012. They have two children. Uusma is the sister of Swedish actress Martina Haag.

English bibliography

Awards 
 2002: Swedish Book Art Award
 2002: International Book Art Competition award
 2003: Best Books of 2003 School Library Journal
 2004: CCCB Choices selection
 2004: American Library Association Notable Books for Children designation
 2004: American Library Association Batchelder Honor Book designation
 2004: American Library Association  Nonfiction Honor Book designation
 2006: Louisiana Young Readers' Choice nominee
 2013: August Prize

References

External links
 

1966 births
August Prize winners
Living people
Swedish children's writers
Swedish women children's writers
Swedish children's book illustrators
Swedish illustrators
Swedish women illustrators
Swedish non-fiction writers
Swedish women non-fiction writers
Writers who illustrated their own writing
21st-century Swedish writers
21st-century Swedish women writers
People from Lidingö Municipality
Swedish women physicians
20th-century Swedish physicians
21st-century Swedish physicians
20th-century women physicians
20th-century Swedish women writers